New Moon Daughter is a studio album by American jazz singer Cassandra Wilson that was released by Blue Note in 1995. The album reached No. 1 on the Billboard magazine jazz album chart and also won the Grammy Award as the Best Jazz Vocal Performance.

Background
In an interview for New York magazine, Wilson explained that the album's name comes from an old Ashanti proverb—"Sickness comes with the waning moon; the new moon cures disease". The album contains twelve songs, five of which were written by Wilson.

Reception

A reviewer for Gramophone was generally positive about the album, praising Wilson's voice and her interpretations of the standards included. However, they said that compared to the originals, Wilson's versions may not be as powerful. They noted that with this album, Wilson appears to move away "from jazz heartlands or cutting edges and towards the embrace of 'pop cult' status." The reviewer particularly enjoyed "Skylark" (calling it "sublime") and "Last Train to Clarksville" ("a delight").

In a positive review of the album, Rolling Stone'''s Geoffrey Himes noted its similarity to Wilson's previous album Blue Light 'til Dawn, but added that New Moon Daughter has more feeling and a darker tone. He wrote that Wilson makes Billie Holiday's "Strange Fruit" "her own". Himes noted the album's overall slow tempo as a weakness, wishing for a little more rhythmic diversity. Scott Yanow of AllMusic described Wilson's voice on the album as "quite bored and emotionally detached" but noted that she was "stretching herself".Village Voice critic Robert Christgau was less impressed, writing that "most of these songs escape her attentions without a mark on them. Which isn't to mention the 'Strange Fruit' that establishes the surpassing weirdness of Billie's original, or the disastrous Monkees cover, designed to prove [Wilson] has a sense of humor I'm now convinced isn't there."

 Appearances in other media 
The song "Death Letter" from the album was used as an opening theme in the third season of television series True Detective'' released in 2019.

Track listing

Personnel
Music
Cassandra Wilson – vocals, acoustic guitar
Cyro Baptista – percussion, Jew's-Harp, shaker
Dougie Bowne – percussion, drums, whistle, vibraphone
Gary Breit – Hammond organ
Kevin Breit – acoustic & electric guitar, banjo, bouzouki
Brandon Ross – acoustic & electric guitar
Charles Burnham – violin
Tony Cedras– accordion
Graham Haynes – cornet
Lawrence "Butch" Morris – cornet
Jeff Haynes – percussion, bongos
Peepers – background vocals
Mark Peterson – bass
Lonnie Plaxico – bass
Gib Wharton – pedal steel guitar
Chris Whitley – guitar (1)
Production
Craig Street – producer
Danny Kopelson – engineer, mixing
Greg Calbi – mastering
John Chiarolanzo – assistant engineer
Bill Emmons – assistant engineer
Scott Gormley – assistant engineer
Fred Kervorkian – editing, assistant engineer
Steve Regina – assistant engineer
John R. Reigart III – assistant engineer
Tom Schick – assistant engineer
Design
David Mayenfisch – photography
Berkeley Barnhill Stewart;- graphic design

Chart positions

References

1995 albums
Blue Note Records albums
Albums produced by Craig Street
Cassandra Wilson albums
Grammy Award for Best Jazz Vocal Album